Bulgarians in Lebanon are between 400–1,000 people. Most of them are Bulgarian women married to Lebanese men and their children, almost all of which live in Beirut.

Culture

Associations

Bulgarian associations are: Association of Nurses in Lebanon (2003) and the Association of Lebanese Civilian Graduates in Bulgaria.

Schools

 Bulgarian Saturday school in Lebanon – Beirut (from 2011)

Folk groups

 Group for Bulgarian Folklore "Bulgarian wrist"

Notable people

 Lia Saad, Miss Lebanon Emigrant 2014
 Samir Ayass, footballer
 Eyad Hammoud, footballer

See also
Arabs in Bulgaria

References

External links
 State Agency for Bulgarians Abroad
 Agency for Bulgarians Abroad 

Ethnic groups in Lebanon
European diaspora in Lebanon
Lebanon
Lebanon